Kanen is the stage name of Karen Pinette-Fontaine (born January 5, 1999), an Innu singer-songwriter from Uashat-Maliotenam, Quebec. She is most noted as a Felix Award nominee for Indigenous Artist of the Year at the 43rd Félix Awards.

Pinette-Fontaine launched her musical career as a member of Florent Vollant's Nikamu Mamuitun collective in 2019, alongside Marcie Michaud-Gagnon, Joëlle St-Pierre, Chloé Lacasse, Scott-Pien Picard, Matiu, Cédrik St-Onge and Ivan Boivin, and released her self-titled debut EP that year. She competed in the 2020 edition of the Francouvertes music competition.

She has also been associated with the Wapikoni Mobile filmmaking collective, for which she directed the short film Battles (Batailles) and appeared as herself in Sonia Bonspille Boileau's documentary film Wapikoni.

References

1999 births
21st-century Canadian singers
21st-century Canadian women musicians
21st-century First Nations people
First Nations filmmakers
First Nations musicians
First Nations women
Canadian women singer-songwriters
Canadian folk singer-songwriters
Canadian women film directors
French-language singers of Canada
Film directors from Quebec
Singers from Quebec
Innu people
Living people